William Cocks may refer to:

William W. Cocks (1861–1932), American politician
William Alfred Cocks (1892–1971), English clockmaker and Northumbrian pipemaker
William Pennington Cocks (1791–1878), English surgeon naturalist
Bill Cocks (1936–2011), Australian footballer

See also
William Cox (disambiguation)
William Coxe (disambiguation)